Coalpits or sometimes Coal Pits is a townland of 386 acres in Athleague parish, in Killeroran district, in the Killian barony, the Union of Mountbellew, in County Galway, Ireland. Coalpits, which is known in Irish as Clais an Ghuail, is adjacent to the town of Hollygrove.

Griffiths Valuation
Griffith's valuation lists the following people in Coalpits who leased the land they farmed from James Thewles:
 Brennan, Thomas
 Conran, Mary
 Patrick Corboy [sic] aka Patrick Conboy
 Cunniffe, Thomas
 Dignan, Peter
 Farrisy, Michael
 Gavan, Michael
Gouran, Edmund
Gouran, Patrick
Gouran, Thomas
 Harraghtin, Patrick
  Kelly, Catherine
 Lohan, Patrick
  Murphy, Michael
  Ryan, Michael

References 

Athleague
Townlands of County Galway